Unjalur railway station is a station near Erode in Tamil Nadu, India.

References

Railway stations in Erode district
Salem railway division